Mittådalen  also known as Mittådalens sameby (south-sami: Mïhte), is a Sami village in the north west part of Härjedalen, Sweden. It is located between Ljusnedal Härjedalens kommun and Storsjö in Bergs kommun. Mittådalen is one of Sweden's 51 Sami villages. A Sami village is partly a geographical area, and partly an economic area for reindeer working Sami people within the area. Flatruet lies nearby.

Singer Jon Henrik Fjällgren lives in Mittådalen.

Gallery

References

Sámi associations
Geography of Jämtland County